Lukáš Dlouhý and Michail Elgin were the defending champions but Dlouhy chose not to compete.
Elgin partnered with Michal Mertiňák and was defeated by losing finalist Gero Kretschmer and Jan-Lennard Struff, who in turn lost to Henri Kontinen and Andreas Siljeström.

Seeds

Draw

Draw

References
 Main Draw

Slovak Open - Doubles
2013 Men's Doubles